Chromodoris lochi, common name Loch's chromodoris, is a species of colourful sea slug, a dorid nudibranch, a marine gastropod mollusk in the family Chromodorididae.

Distribution 
This species is found in the tropical waters of the central Indo-Pacific region and is known to range from Malaysia, Indonesia, Philippines to Fiji and the northern coast of Australia.

Description
Chromodoris lochi is blue or blueish-white with a white margin and typically dark or black lines running down the mantle and the foot. On the mantle, a continuous line runs around the border passing on the outside of the rhinophore and a second median one can be discontinuous. Individuals can reach at least 4 cm in length. There is some variation between individuals in this species, and the gills (retractile) and rhinophores (contractile) range in colour from a translucent straw-color, through to pink and light orange. This species is very similar in appearance to Chromodoris willani, Chromodoris boucheti and Chromodoris dianae and can be difficult to tell apart. Its most distinguishing feature is the uniform colouring of the mantle and the lack of white specks which are present in some of the other species. A recent study showed that more than one species is currently confused amongst Chromodoris lochi.

In popular culture
Chromodoris lochi was the inspiration for the Pokémon Shellos and Gastrodon which first appeared in Pokémon Diamond & Pearl.

Ecology
Chromodoris lochi, like many other dorid nudibranchs, feeds on sponges.  It has been reported to eat Cacospongia mycofijiensis and Semitaspongia, both in the family Thorectidae.

References

External links
 

Chromodorididae
Gastropods described in 1982